Sir Richard Johnston, 1st Baronet (1 August 1743 – 22 April 1795) was an Anglo-Irish politician in the Irish House of Commons. 

Johnston was High Sheriff of Down in 1765, High Sheriff of Armagh in 1771 and was made a baronet, of Gilford in the Baronetage of Ireland on 27 July 1772. Between 1776 and 1783 he was the Member of Parliament for Kilbeggan, before representing Blessington from 1783 until his death in 1795. He was succeeded in his title by his son, William. 

In March 1772, Johnston was the target of violent protests by the Hearts of Steel, who attacked his castle at Gilford, County Down. This resulted in a gun battle during which Johnston was forced to flee the castle by swimming across the River Bann.

References

1743 births
1795 deaths
18th-century Anglo-Irish people
Baronets in the Baronetage of Ireland
High Sheriffs of Armagh
High Sheriffs of Down
Irish MPs 1776–1783
Irish MPs 1783–1790
Irish MPs 1790–1797
Members of the Parliament of Ireland (pre-1801) for County Westmeath constituencies
Members of the Parliament of Ireland (pre-1801) for County Wicklow constituencies